Movie Masters is an action figure toyline from Mattel based on popular movie franchises most notably DC Comics. The line has featured characters from the films Superman, Avatar, The Dark Knight trilogy, Green Lantern, and Man of Steel. Figures in the line are sculpted by Four Horsemen Studios, who also sculpted figures for Mattel's DC Superheroes and DC Universe Classics lines.

6" Figures

The Dark Knight
In June 2008, these figures are based on the film The Dark Knight and its predecessor Batman Begins.

Single carded

Series 1
Batman (The Dark Knight suit)
Batman (The Dark Knight suit, unmasked variant)
Gotham City Thug
The Joker

Series 2
Batman (Batman Begins suit)
Batman (Batman Begins suit, demon variant)
Scarecrow

MattyCollector.com exclusives
These figures (with the exception of Joker as Gotham City Thug) were also available at Toys "R" Us beginning in April, 2010.
The Joker as Gotham City Thug
Survival Suit Bruce Wayne
Harvey Dent
The Joker (jail cell version with Missile Launcher)
Scarecrow (in business suit)
Batman (night vision)
Two-Face

Multi-Packs (Toys "R" Us exclusives)
Batman Vs. The Joker
Batman Vs. The Scarecrow
Survival Suit Bruce Wayne and Jim Gordon
Batman and Honor Guard Joker

Vehicle (Target exclusive)
Bat-Pod

Green Lantern
These figures are based on the 2011 Green Lantern film starring Ryan Reynolds.

Series 1
Hal Jordan
Rot Lop Fan
Tomar-Re

Series 1.5
NautKeLoi

Series 2
Isamot Kol
Sinestro

Series 3
Krona
Maskless Hal Jordan with Bzzd

Series 4
Galius Zed
Hector Hammond

Series 5
Morro, DC comic book character
Parallax, DC comic book character

Exclusive
Green Man

Two-Packs
Hal Jordan and Abin Sur
Hal Jordan and Krona
Hal Jordan and Tomar-Re
Sinestro and Hal Jordan

SDCC 2011 Exclusive
Kilowog

The Dark Knight Rises
These figures are based on the 2012 film The Dark Knight Rises. Each figure included a set piece to create the Bat-Signal featured in the series.

Single Card
Batman
Batman w/ blueprints (Kmart exclusive)
Bane
Alfred Pennyworth
Catwoman
Catwoman w/ goggles down (variant)
John Blake
Jim Gordon (Walmart exclusive)
Ra's al Ghul

Two Pack
Batman vs. Bane (Toys R Us)

SDCC 2012 Exclusive
Bruce Wayne to Batman

The Dark Knight Trilogy
Batman (Batman Begins), Batman (The Dark Knight), and Batman (The Dark Knight Rises) 3-pack (Toys R Us Exclusive)

Man of Steel
In May 2013, these figures were released based on the film Man of Steel.

Series 1
Superman
Jor-El
General Zod

Series 2
Faora
 General Zod (in shackles)
 General Zod (in battle armor)
 Superman (with Kryptonian Key)
 Superman (with Black Suit)

Batman v Superman

Series 1
Batman
Superman
Wonder Woman
Batman (Armored)

Series 2
Batman (Knightmare Batman)
Lex Luthor
Aquaman

12" Figures
These figures are exclusive to MattyCollector.com and are based on the 1978 film Superman.

Superman
Lex Luthor
General Zod

These figures are exclusive to MattyCollector.com and are based on the 2011 film Green Lantern.
Hal Jordan

External links
Movie Masters at Batman: Yesterday, Today, and Beyond

Further reading
Zenker, Gary (2013). Ultimate DC Comics Action Figures and Collectibles Checklist. White Lightning Publishing. 

Mattel
2000s toys
2010s toys
DC Comics action figure lines